Melissa Chase may refer to:
Melissa Chase, American cryptographer
Melissa Chase, animated character in television series Milo Murphy's Law
Melissa Chase, morning drive time host on Richmond, Virginia radio station WURV
Melissa Mae Chase, wife of actor and martial artist Mark Arnott